James MacKillop (born May 31, 1939, Pontiac, Michigan) is an American professor and scholar of Celtic and Irish studies and an arts journalist A child of Gaelic-speaking Highland emigrants, he is also a near relative of St Mary MacKillop of Australia (1842-1909).

Early life and education

MacKillop was raised in Southeast Michigan and attended the University of Detroit High School and  Wayne State University  (BA, MA in English). At Wayne he wrote for the Daily Collegian and captained the university team on the GE College Bowl television program. He received a Ph.D. from Syracuse University and was a visiting fellow in Celtic Languages at Harvard University. He has lived in Upstate New York since the late sixties.

Career
MacKillop taught for more than forty years at various universities. Appointments include Michigan Technological University,
Onondaga Community College, State University of New York College at Cortland and the S. I. Newhouse School of Public Communications. He also held a year's appointment as Professeur Invité at the University of Rennes 1 in France. He was awarded the SUNY Chancellor's Award for Excellence..

MacKillop has published nine books, dozens of scholarly articles, and thousands of newspaper items. His best-known book is probably The Dictionary of Celtic Mythology (Oxford), once the top seller in Celtic scholarship. Myth & Legends of the Celts (Penguin) is widely cited. His Irish Literature: A Reader (Syracuse), with Maureen Murphy is frequently used in university Irish literature courses. Speaking of Words (Holt, Rinehart) was co-edited with Donna Woolfolk Cross, later author of the international best-seller Pope Joan (Crown). Writing for newspapers since college years, MacKillop has been most associated with the Syracuse New Times , where he has been the drama critic for decades, winning the Syracuse Press Club Award for criticism sixteen times.

Joining as a graduate student, MacKillop has long been active in the  American Conference for Irish Studies (ACIS), serving on the executive committee for ten years, organizing three national conventions (Syracuse, 1989; Belfast-Queens U., 1995; Albany, 1997), and serving as president, 1995–97.

Awards

 National Endowment for the Humanities, Fellowship for Independent Study
 SUNY Chancellor's Award for Excellence in Teaching
 Appointed Professeur Invité, Université de Rennes, d’Haute Bretagne
 Syracuse Press Club Award for Criticism, sixteen times

Publications

Books
With Donna Woolfolk Cross, Speaking of Words: A Language Reader New York: Holt, Rinehart & Winston, 1978, 1982, 1986
 With Thomas Friedmann,The Copy Book New York: Holt, Rinehart & Winston, 1980
 Fionn mac Cumhaill: Celtic Myth in English Literature Syracuse: Syracuse University Press, 1986, 2001
With Maureen O'Rourke Murphy, Irish Literature: A Reader Syracuse: Syracuse University Press, 1987.  Revised as An Irish Literature Reader. Syracuse: Syracuse University Press, 2005
 Dictionary of Celtic Mythology Oxford: Oxford University Press, 1998
 Contemporary Irish Cinema: From the Quiet Man to Dancing at Lughnasa Syracuse: Syracuse University Press, 1999
 Myths and Legends of the Celts London: Penguin Books, 2005
 Unauthorized History of the American Conference for Irish Studies 2012
 “The Rebels” and Selected Short Fiction by Richard Power Syracuse: Syracuse University Press, 2018

Articles (selected)
 A Primer of Irish Numbers, Irish Spirit, ed. Patricia Monaghan. Dublin: Wolfhound Press, 2001. .
 Politics and Spelling Irish, or Thirteen Ways of Looking at ‘Banshee’, Canadian Journal of Irish Studies, 27, no. 2 (Dec., 1991), 93–102.
 Fitzgerald's Gatsby: Star of Stag and Screen, The Recorder: A Journal of the American Irish Historical Society, 3, no. 2 (Winter, 1989), 76–88.
 Fionn mac Cumhaill, Our Contemporary, Mythe et folklore celtiques et leurs expressions littéraires en Irlande, ed. R. Alluin et B. Esbarbelt. Lille, Fr: Université de Lille, 1986 (1988). .
 The Quiet Man Speaks, Working Papers in Irish Studies [Northeastern University, Boston], 87-2/3 (Spring, 1987), 32–44.
 Meville's Bartleby on Film, American Short Stories on Film, ed. E. Alsen. Munich: Langenscheidt-Longman, 1986. .
 Ireland and the Movies: From the Volta Cinema to RTÉ, Éire-Ireland, 18, no. 3 (Summer, 1984), 7-22.
 The Hungry Grass: Richard Power's Pastoral Elegy, Éire-Ireland, 18, no. 3 (Fall, 1983), 86–99.
 Yeats, Joyce and the Irish Language, Éire-Ireland, 15, no. 1 (Spring, 1980), 138–148.
 Finn MacCool: The Hero and the Anti-Hero, Views of the Irish Peasantry, 1800-1916, ed. D. Casey and R. E. Rhodes. Hamden, Ct: Archon Books, 1977. .
 Ulster Violence in Fiction, Conflict in Ireland, ed. E. A. Sullivan and H. A. Wilson. Gainesville: University of Florida, Department of Behavioral Studies, 1976. .
 Yeats and the Gaelic Muse, Antigonish Review, no. 11 (Autumn, 1972), 96–109.

References

External links
 

1939 births
Living people
People from Pontiac, Michigan
Wayne State University alumni
Syracuse University alumni
Celtic studies scholars